The 1956 New Zealand Grand Prix was a motor race held at the Ardmore Circuit on 7 January 1956. Stirling Moss entered the weekend as the favourite, and would deliver with a commanding victory, with the fastest lap to boot. Tony Gaze and Peter Whitehead completed the podium for the second year running.

Gaze initially lead the race off the starting line, but would be passed soon after by Moss, who thereafter enjoyed a largely trouble-free race to the flag, with the only problems encountered being a broken fuel lead which sprayed fuel back into the cockpit and forced the Brit to make another pitstop toward the end. The lead was such however that the Ferrari's of Gaze and Whitehead could not hope to challenge for a potential victory.

Classification

Notes 
Fastest lap:  Stirling Moss : 1:28.0

References

New Zealand Grand Prix
Grand Prix
January 1956 sports events in New Zealand